Moschellandsbergite is a rare isometric mineral made up of a silver-white amalgam of mercury and silver with the chemical makeup Ag2Hg3.

It was first described in 1938 and named after Moschellandsberg Mountain near Obermoschel, Rhineland-Palatinate, Germany. It is considered a  low-temperature hydrothermal mineral which occurs with metacinnabar, cinnabar, mercurian silver, tetrahedrite–tennantite, pyrite, sphalerite and chalcopyrite.

References

Native element minerals
Mercury minerals
Silver minerals
Cubic minerals
Minerals in space group 197
Minerals described in 1938